The Ordinariate for Eastern Catholics in Poland (Poland of the Eastern Rite) (Polish Ordynariat dla wiernych obrządku wschodniego) is the Ordinariate for Eastern Catholic faithful (pseudo-diocesan Eastern Catholic jurisdiction alongside a country's Latin hierarchy) for the members of non-Latin rite-specific particular churches sui iuris in Poland, excepting Ukrainian Greek Catholic Church, which had its own church structure and Catholic Church of the Byzantine-Slavic rite, emerged in a Roman Catholic structure.

History 
In September 18, 1981, it was established as Ordinariate of Poland for Greek and Armenian Catholics by Pope John Paul II (Greek presumably referring to all Byzantine Rite Catholic churches), detached from the Latin Metropolitan Archdiocese of Warszawa, but vested in that see, whose incumbents were all created Cardinal.

On 16 January 1991, following the erection of two Ukrainian Greek Catholic eparchies, the Ordinariate assumed its current name and limited its jurisdiction.

Since 2007 147 faithful of the Catholic Church of the Byzantine-Slavic rite (Neouniate Church) belonged to the parish of Kostomłoty were entrusted to the pastoral care of the Latin bishop of Siedlce.

In fact, therefore, since all Byzantine ritual parishes have now been excluded, the jurisdiction of the ordinary is exercised only on those of the Armenian rite. From a Archbishop Nycz's decree on 1 December 2009, the Ordinariate obtained jurisdiction over three churches, all of them belonging to the Armenian rite.

Territory and statistics 
The ordinariate is exempt, directly dependent on the Holy See (not part of any ecclesiastical province and the Roman Congregation for the Oriental Churches). It is headquartered in Warsaw (the primatial see and its ordinary is the Latin hierarch of the Archdiocese of Warsaw.

Parishes 

There are three parishes in the Ordinariate:

 Armenian-Catholic Southern Parish in Gliwice (Holy Trinity Church)
 Armenian Catholic Parish in Warsaw (Church of Saint Gregory of Narek)
 Armenian Catholic Northern Parish in Gdańsk (Church of the Holy Apostles Peter and Paul)

As per 2014, its pastorally served 670 Eastern Catholics in 3 parishes and 2 missions with 4 diocesan priests.

Episcopal ordinaries
(all Roman Rite)

Ordinaries of Poland of the Eastern Rite
 Józef Glemp (1981.09.18 – 2007.06.09)
 Kazimierz Nycz (2007.06.09 – ...)

Sources

 Annuario Pontificio, Libreria Editrice Vaticana, Città del Vaticano, 2003, .

References

External links and sources 
 GCatholic, with Google map
 Catholic-hierarchy.org
 ordynariat.ormianie.pl

Ordinariates for Eastern Catholic faithful
Eastern Catholicism in Poland
Roman Catholic dioceses in Poland
Christianity in Warsaw